Digiguide is a digital TV guide in the UK.

Features
Digiguide supports listings for many of the UK channels, and encourages broadcasters to join the service at no cost to them. The program can also import listings for channels from other countries in various formats (for example XMLTV) using a converter. Users can also create and share their own listings.

The software used to be available as a 30-day free trial, however, it was reduced to 7 days sometime in 2011. After the free trial it is paid for by subscription. It operates a referral programme, with the incentive of subscription extensions for successful referrals.

The functions of Digiguide are also available using a browser and on portable devices via the separate myDigiGuide.com service.

The Digiguide TV and radio listings data, in a variety of formats and time zones, is available as a corporate service.

Digiguide and its holding company GipsyMedia were purchased in 2010 by EBS New Media Limited, a company that specialises in producing TV schedules and EPG services for many TV channels worldwide. The Digiguide team is based in Exmouth, Devon.

Criticism 
Controversy arose when an early, free, advertising supported, version included Conducent Timesink advertising software. After removing this software, following customer complaints, Digiguide moved to a pure subscription business model.

References

External links 
 

Television schedules
Windows multimedia software